is a train station on the Kagoshima Main Line operated by JR Kyushu located in Koga, Fukuoka Prefecture, Japan.

Lines

Layout
The station consists of two opposed side platforms serving two tracks.

Adjacent stations

History
The station was opened by JR Kyushu on 30 September 1991 as an added station on the existing Kagoshima Main Line track.

See also 
List of railway stations in Japan

References

External links
Chidori (JR Kyushu)

Railway stations in Fukuoka Prefecture
Railway stations in Japan opened in 1991